"All the Times I Cried" is the debut solo single by Texas lead singer Sharleen Spiteri, from her debut solo album, Melody. It was digitally released in the UK on 30 June 2008 and physically released on 7 July 2008.

Track listing 
"All the Times I Cried" 
"When Did You Leave Heaven"

Music video 
The music video shows Spiteri having a conversation with a lover over the telephone, potentially breaking up with her. She is heard saying, "I just can't do it anymore". Following this, viewers see two other girls auditioning for a singing role in French Theatre, while Spiteri snoops around looking sad, and then performs - impressing the judges.

Charts

External links 

 Music video

2008 songs
2008 debut singles
Sharleen Spiteri songs
Songs written by Johnny McElhone
Songs written by Sharleen Spiteri
Mercury Records singles